Rosche is a Samtgemeinde ("collective municipality") in the district of Uelzen, in Lower Saxony, Germany. Its seat is in the village Rosche.

The Samtgemeinde Rosche consists of the following municipalities:
 Oetzen 
 Rätzlingen 
 Rosche
 Stoetze 
 Suhlendorf

Samtgemeinden in Lower Saxony
Uelzen (district)